Mapbox is an American provider of custom online maps for websites and applications such as Foursquare, Lonely Planet, the Financial Times, The Weather Channel, Instacart Inc. and Snapchat. Since 2010, it has rapidly expanded the niche of custom maps, as a response to the limited choice offered by map providers such as Google Maps. 

By 2020, Mapbox switched to a proprietary software license for most of the software it previously maintained as open source.
As of October 2020, Mapbox had a valuation of $1 billion.

History
The startup was created as a part of Development Seed in order to offer map customization for non-profit customers, in 2010. It was bootstrapped until a 2013 $10 million Series A funding round by Foundry Group. In June 2015, Mapbox announced it had raised $52.55 million in a Series B round of funding led by DFJ Growth.

Early work on OpenStreetMap tools, including the iD editor, was funded by a $575,000 grant from the Knight Foundation.

On July 11, 2016, MapQuest discontinued the open tile API and users such as GNOME Maps were switched to a temporarily free tier of the Mapbox tileserver, while considering alternatives.

In October 2017, SoftBank led a $164 million investment in Mapbox Inc., with other existing investors including venture-capital firms Foundry Group, DFJ Growth, DBL Partners and Thrive Capital.  In November 2017, Mapbox acquired the Belarus-based neural network startup Mapdata.

In January 2018, Mapbox acquired the team behind the open-source routing engine Valhalla.

In December 2020, Mapbox released the second version of their JavaScript library for online display of maps, Mapbox GL JS. Previously open source code under a BSD license, the new version switched to proprietary licensing. This resulted in a fork of the open source code, MapLibre GL, and initiation of the MapLibre project.

In March 2021, the company appointed a new chief executive officer Peter Sirota, replacing Eric Gundersen who has been with Mapbox since 2010.

In June 2021, workers at Mapbox announced that a group of employees had signed union authorization cards to be represented by the Communication Workers of America through CODE-CWA. The union election, which followed in August, failed with 123 "no" votes cast versus 81 in favor. In June 2022, an article on Protocol.com was released describing union-busting tactics used at Mapbox. One the same day, the NLRB issued a complaint against Mapbox for threats and firing union organizers. A court date is set for October 3, 2022.

Data sources and technology
The data is taken from open data sources, such as OpenStreetMap and NASA, and from purchased proprietary data sources, such as DigitalGlobe. The technology is based on Node.js, Mapnik, GDAL, and Leaflet.

Mapbox uses anonymized data from telemetry pings, such as Strava and RunKeeper, to identify likely missing data in OpenStreetMap with automatic methods, then manually applies the fixes or reports the issue to OSM contributors.

See also
 TomTom
 ArcGIS
 HERE Maps
 Google Maps
 OpenStreetMap
 QGIS

References

External links

 
 Mapbox Streets, a global map with street level detail
 Mapbox Outdoors, a high-level topographic and bathymetric map
 Earthquake Risk Zones, Earthquake risks mapped against active USAID projects in the pacific rim region.

Internet properties established in 2010
Web mapping